The Red Wa is the most powerful organized crime gang in Thailand. The Red Wa come from Burma and they are associated with the United Wa State Army. They are composed of people from the Wa ethnic group and they work together with Chinese organized criminals in the drug trade. The Red Wa control the methamphetamine trade in Thailand and neighboring countries and are also known for being involved in the trafficking and sale of other drugs, mainly heroin. Although they primarily focus on drug trafficking, groups associated with the United Wa State Army have also been involved in other crimes in order to protect their territory.

References

Transnational organized crime
Organized crime groups in Myanmar
Organised crime groups in Thailand